Perfluorooctanesulfonamide (PFOSA) is a synthetic organofluorine compound. It is a fluorocarbon derivative and a perfluorinated compound, having an eight-carbon chain and a terminal sulfonamide functional group. PFOSA, a persistent organic pollutant, was an ingredient in 3M's former Scotchgard formulation from 1956 until 2003, and the compound was used to repel grease and water in food packaging along with other consumer applications. It breaks down to form perfluorooctane sulfonate (PFOS). The perfluorooctanesulfonyl fluoride-based chemistry that was used to make sulfonamides like PFOSA was phased out by 3M in the United States (US) during 2000–2002 but it has grown in China by other producers.

PFOSA can be synthesized from perfluorooctanesulfonyl halides by reaction with liquid ammonia or by a two step reaction via an azide followed by reduction with Zn and HCl. PFOSA is also a metabolic by-product of N-alkylated perfluorooctanesulfonamides. For example, N-ethyl perfluorooctanesulfonamidoethanol (N-EtFOSE), which was primarily used on paper,
and N-methyl perfluorooctanesulfonamidoethanol (N-MeFOSE), which was primarily used on carpets and textiles, both metabolize via acetates to PFOSA.

In addition, PFOSA is thought to be the biologically active form of the insecticide Sulfluramid (N-ethyl perfluorooctanesulfonamide)
as it is an extremely potent uncoupler of oxidative phosphorylation
with an IC50 of about 1 micromolar (≈500 nanograms per milliliter or parts per billion). PFOSA was the most toxic perfluorinated compound in a study with PC12 cells. Concentrations ranged from 10 to 250 micromolar in the study (or 5000 to 125,000 parts per billion).

Wildlife biomonitoring studies have found the highest level of PFOSA in the liver of common dolphin (Mediterranean Sea, Italy) with a concentration of 878 parts per billion; the liver of mink from Illinois, US, contained 590 parts per billion. In fish, the highest levels detected were in the liver of Norway Pike (91 parts per billion) and homogenates of slimy sculpin (150 parts per billion) from Lake Ontario. Differences in biotransformation across species could explain some of its presence. In humans, PFOSA has been detected in sub- to low-parts per billion levels; for example, in 1999–2000 US serum samples, the 95th percentile (or value where only 5% of the population was higher) was 1.4 parts per billion while in 2003–2004 the 95th percentile fell to 0.2 parts per billion. However, whole-blood concentrations are about five times higher than those in blood plasma or serum.

See also
Fluorosurfactant
Ionophore

References

External links
Perfluorinated Alkylated Substances (PFAS) in the European Nordic Environment

Perfluorinated compounds
Sulfonamides